The Forbidden Plateau is a long, narrow plateau extending southwestward from Charlotte Bay to Flandres Bay in Graham Land. It borders Bruce Plateau on the south and Foster Plateau on the north. The feature was mapped by the Falkland Islands Dependencies Survey (FIDS) from photos taken by Hunting Aerosurveys Ltd. in 1956–57. Its name was picked by the UK Antarctic Place-names Committee (UK-APC) because all attempts to reach the plateau failed until it was finally traversed by Falkland Islands Dependencies Survey (FIDS) members in 1957.

Central plateaus of Graham Land
North to south:
 Laclavère Plateau
 Louis Philippe Plateau
 Detroit Plateau
 Herbert Plateau
 Foster Plateau
 Forbidden Plateau
 Bruce Plateau
 Avery Plateau
 Hemimont Plateau

See also 
Blue Icefalls

References

External links 
 

Plateaus of Antarctica
Landforms of Graham Land
Danco Coast